Kaspars Gerhards (born 7 February 1969 in Jelgava, Latvia) is a Latvian politician of the TB/LNNK (2008–11), respectively National Alliance (since 2011) party. He was the economy minister from 2007 to 2009, minister of transport from 2009 to 2010 and minister of environmental protection and regional development from 2014 to 2019. Since January 2019 he has served as minister of agriculture of Latvia.

References

1969 births
Living people
People from Jelgava
Ministers of Economics of Latvia
Transport ministers of Latvia
Ministers of the Environment of Latvia
Ministers of Agriculture of Latvia
For Fatherland and Freedom/LNNK politicians
National Alliance (Latvia) politicians
University of Latvia alumni
Recipients of the Order of Prince Yaroslav the Wise, 3rd class